"Paasa (T.A.N.G.A.)" is a single by Filipino singer and composer Yeng Constantino. The song was originally a short impromptu song composed and performed by Yeng during her first ever digital concert. The song was released by Star Music on September 1, 2016. Its official lyric and music videos were uploaded to YouTube on September 1, 2016 and September 24, 2016 respectively. The song eventually became part of Constantino's compilation album entitled Yeng 10: 10 Years of Yeng Constantino. T.A.N.G.A. is not an acronym, actually, it came from the Tagalog word tanga which means fool.

Track listing

Credits and personnel
Credits adapted from YouTube.

 Music and lyrics: Yeng Constantino
 Publisher: Star Music
 Arrangement: Ria Villena-Osorio
 Drums: Lawrence Nolan
 Bass: Karel Honasan
 Vocal arrangement: Jonathan Manalo
 Back-up vocals: Chir Cataran
 Mixed and Mastered by: Dante Tañedo
 Producer: Ria Villena-Osorio and Jonathan Manalo

Chart performance

See also
 Yeng Constantino discography

References

2016 songs
2016 singles
Yeng Constantino songs
Tagalog-language songs